Arnold F. Meyer and/or his firm the Arnold F. Meyer & Co. was a builder in Milwaukee, Wisconsin.  The firm was incorporated in 1924.  Meyer and his firm built a number of buildings according to designs of architect Ernest Flagg that are listed on the National Register of Historic Places.

Meyer had previously been associated with the Rath Construction Company where he became acquainted with Flagg's methods for construction of small homes.  In 1924, Meyer formed Arnold F. Meyer & Company, Inc. to build small homes using Flagg's methods.  The company built four such houses, all of them for Meyer's members.  At least 25 of the homes were built, but the company went out of business by the end of 1925.

Buildings that were built by Meyer or his company include:
Rufus Arndt House, 4524 N. Cramer St., Whitefish Bay, Wisconsin (Arnold F. Meyer & Co.) NRHP-listed
Barfield-Staples House, 5461—5463 Danbury Rd., Whitefish Bay, Wisconsin (Arnold F. Meyer & Co.) NRHP-listed
Thomas Bossert House, 2614 E. Menlo Blvd., Shorewood, Wisconsin (Arnold F. Meyer & Co.) NRHP-listed
Erwin Cords House, 1913 E. Olive St., Shorewood, Wisconsin (Arnold F. Meyer) NRHP-listed
H. R. Davis House, 6839 Cedar St., Wauwatosa, Wisconsin (Arnold F. Meyer & Co.) NRHP-listed
J. H. Fiebing House, 7707 Stickney, Wauwatosa, Wisconsin (Arnold F. Meyer & Co.) NRHP-listed
Otto F. Fiebing House, 302 N. Hawley Rd., Milwaukee, Wisconsin (Arnold F. Meyer) NRHP-listed
George Gabel House, 4600 N. Cramer St., Whitefish Bay, Wisconsin (Arnold F. Meyer & Co.) NRHP-listed
Warren B. George House, 7105 Grand Pkwy., Wauwatosa, Wisconsin (Arnold F. Meyer & Co.) NRHP-listed
Paul S. Grant House, 984 E. Circle Dr., Whitefish Bay, Wisconsin (Arnold F. Meyer & Co.) NRHP-listed
Harrison Hardie House, 4540 N. Cramer St., Whitefish Bay, Wisconsin (Arnold F. Meyer & Co.) NRHP-listed
Horace W. Hatch House, 739 E. Beaumont, Whitefish Bay, Wisconsin (Arnold F. Meyer & Co.) NRHP-listed
Seneca W. & Bertha Hatch House, 3821 N. Prospect Ave., Shorewood, Wisconsin (Arnold F. Meyer) NRHP-listed
Alfred M. Hoelz House, 3449—3451 Frederick Ave., Milwaukee, Wisconsin (Arnold F. Meyer & Co.) NRHP-listed
Willis Hopkins House, 325 Glenview, Wauwatosa, Wisconsin (Arnold F. Meyer & Co.) NRHP-listed
Halbert D. Jenkins House, 1028 E. Lexington Blvd., Whitefish Bay, Wisconsin (Arnold F. Meyer & Co.) NRHP-listed
John F. McEwens House, 829 E. Lake Forest, Whitefish Bay, Wisconsin (Arnold F. Meyer & Co.) NRHP-listed
Henry A. Meyer House, 3559 N. Summit Ave., Shorewood, Wisconsin (Arnold F. Meyer & Co.) NRHP-listed
Starke Meyer House, 7896 N. Club Circle, Fox Point, Wisconsin (Arnold F. Meyer & Co.) NRHP-listed
George E. Morgan House, 4448 N. Maryland Ave., Shorewood, Wisconsin (Arnold F. Meyer & Co.) NRHP-listed
Pearl C. Norton House, 2021 Church St., Wauwatosa, Wisconsin (Arnold F. Meyer & Co.) NRHP-listed
Frederick Sperling House, 1016 E. Lexington Blvd., Whitefish Bay, Wisconsin (Arnold F. Meyer & Co.) NRHP-listed
William Van Altena House, 1916 E. Glendale, Whitefish Bay, Wisconsin (Arnold F. Meyer & Co.) NRHP-listed
G. B. Van Devan House, 4601 N. Murray Ave., Whitefish Bay, Wisconsin (Arnold F. Meyer & Co.) NRHP-listed
Frank J. Williams House, 912 E. Lexington Blvd., Whitefish Bay, Wisconsin (Arnold F. Meyer & Co.) NRHP-listed

References

Architecture firms based in Wisconsin
 
Companies based in Milwaukee
1924 establishments in Wisconsin
1925 disestablishments in Wisconsin
National Register of Historic Places in Milwaukee